Naft Ghaemshahr  is an Iranian football club based in Qa'em Shahr, Iran that was founded in 1990. They competed in the Azadegan League. They are owned by the National Iranian Oil Company.

References

Association football clubs established in 1990
1990 establishments in Iran